Baldwin is a former mining town from the late 19th century located about 8.5 miles southwest of Crested Butte, Colorado. While Baldwin is not commonly known as a ghost town, many of the original structures still exist. Much of the land that the few structures are on is now privately owned.

The town of Baldwin came to be because of the coalfields that were discovered at the base of Mount Carbon, now called Carbon Peak.

Baldwin became a ghost town due to the departure and subsequent abandonment of The Denver and South Park railroad that served Baldwin.

References

External links 

 Description of Baldwin, CO history
 The Fence Post Article

Ghost towns in Colorado
Former populated places in Gunnison County, Colorado
Colorado Mining Boom